Major General Erkki Johannes Raappana (June 2, 1893 – September 14, 1962) was the commander of the 14th Division of the Finnish Army during the Second World War.

Raappana was born in Oulujoki. From 1916 to 1918, he served in the 27th Jäger Battalion, a light infantry unit of the Imperial German Army. In 1918 he took part in the Finnish Civil War as a lieutenant of the White side.  Among many of his known accomplishments, General Raappana was chosen to command the Finnish detachment - nicknamed "Group Raappana" ("Ryhmä Raappana" in Finnish) - that was to stop the enemy in the very final Finnish-Soviet battle during World War II.  It was the Battle of Ilomantsi, fought during the Continuation War (1941–1944).

The battle lasted from July 26 to August 13, 1944. It ended with a Finnish victory, as the last major Soviet attack against Finland was stopped here. Two elite Red Army divisions were completely routed after a week and a half of fighting, leaving behind over 3 200 Red Army soldiers dead, thousands wounded and missing, and over 100 pieces of heavy artillery and approximately 100 mortars and the rest of the Soviet ordnance for the Finns to capture.

General Raappana was specialized and experienced particularly in forest warfare.  He was awarded the most distinguished military award in Finland, the Mannerheim Cross. After the War he was the Quarter-Master General of the Finnish Army and in 1947, his promotion to senior Army Corps Commander or the Chief of the Defence Forces position in 1949 and 1950 was persistently blocked by Soviet interests, and he had to retire at Major General rank in 1952. He died in Joensuu, aged 69.

External links
 Ilomantsi at War

1893 births
1962 deaths
People from North Ostrobothnia
People from Oulu Province (Grand Duchy of Finland)
Finnish major generals
German Army personnel of World War I
People of the Finnish Civil War (White side)
Finnish military personnel of World War II
Knights of the Mannerheim Cross
Jägers of the Jäger Movement